Lalitpur District (a part of Bagmati Province, is one of the seventy-seven districts of Nepal. It is one of the three districts in the Kathmandu Valley, along with Kathmandu and Bhaktapur. Its population was 466,784 in the initial 2011 census tabulation. It is surrounded by Makwanpur, Bhaktapur, Kathmandu and Kavre.

Geography and climate

Demographics
At the time of the 2011 Nepal census, Lalitpur District had a population of 468,132. Of these, 47.3% spoke Nepali, 30.3% Newar, 11.4% Tamang, 2.5% Maithili, 1.4% Magar, 1.1% Rai, 1.0% Bhojpuri, 0.7% Tharu, 0.6% Gurung, 0.6% Limbu, 0.5% Hindi, 0.4% Pahari, 0.2% Danuwar, 0.2% Sunuwar, 0.2% Urdu, 0.1% Bengali, 0.1% Bantawa, 0.1% Chamling, 0.1% Doteli, 0.1% English, 0.1% Rajasthani, 0.1% Sherpa, 0.1% Tibetan and 0.3% other languages as their first language.

In terms of ethnicity/caste, 33.8% were Newar, 18.8% Chhetri, 13.1% Tamang, 13.0% Hill Brahmin, 4.6% Magar, 2.7% Rai, 1.2% Gurung, 1.2% Tharu, 1.1% Kami, 0.9% Limbu, 0.8% Pahari, 0.7% Sarki, 0.7% Thakuri, 0.6% Musalman, 0.5% Damai/Dholi, 0.5% Yadav, 0.4% Sanyasi/Dasnami, 0.3% other Dalit, 0.3% Danuwar, 0.3% Kalwar, 0.3% Majhi, 0.3% Sunuwar, 0.3% Teli, 0.2% Terai Brahmin, 0.2% Gharti/Bhujel, 0.2% Hajam/Thakur, 0.2% Kayastha, 0.2% Koiri/Kushwaha, 0.2% Marwadi, 0.2% Sherpa, 0.2% other Terai, 0.1% Badi, 0.1% Bengali, 0.1% Chamar/Harijan/Ram, 0.1% Dhanuk, 0.1% foreigners, 0.1% Ghale, 0.1% Halwai, 0.1% Kathabaniyan, 0.1% Kumal, 0.1% Kurmi, 0.1% Lohar, 0.1% Punjabi/Sikh, 0.1% Rajput, 0.1% Sudhi, 0.1% Thakali and 0.1% others.

In terms of religion, 73.5% were Hindu, 19.3% Buddhist, 5.0% Christian, 1.2% Kirati, 0.7% Muslim and 0.2% others.

In terms of literacy, 82.2% could read and write, 1.7% could only read and 15.9% could neither read nor write.

Administrative division
There are six municipalities in Lalitpur District, including three Rural Municipalities and one Metropolitan city:
 Lalitpur Metropolitan City
 Mahalaxmi Municipality
 Godawari Municipality
 Konjyoson Rural Municipality
 Bagmati Rural Municipality 
 Mahankal Rural Municipality

Former Village Development Committees
Prior to federal restructuring, the following Village development committees were also part of the district. By 2017, they were all merged into municipalities or rural municipalities or were included into Lalitpur Metropolitan City.
 Ashrang
 Badikhel, now Godawari Municipality
 Bhardev
 Bhattedanda
 Bisankhunarayan, now Godawari Municipality
 Bungamati (Bunga), Now at Lalitpur Metropolitan city 22
 Bukhel
 Bhainsapti, now Karyabinayak Municipality
 Chandanpur
 Chapagaun, now Godawari Municipality
 Chaughare
 Chhampi, now Karyabinayak Municipality
 Dalchoki
 Devichaur
 Dhapakhel, now Lalitpur Municipality
 Dukuchhap, now Karyabinayak Municipality
 Ghusel
 Gimdi
 Godamchaur, now Godawari Municipality
 Godawari, now Godawari Municipality
 Gotikhel
 Harisiddhi, now Lalitpur Municipality
 Ikudol
 Imadol, now Mahalakshmi Municipality
 Jharuwarasi, now Godawari Municipality
 Kaleshwar
 Khokana, now Karyabinayak Municipality
 Lamatar, now Mahalakshmi Municipality
 Lele, now Godawari Municipality
 Lubhu, now Mahalakshmi Municipality
 Malta
 Manikhel
 Nallu
 Pyutar
 Sainbu, now Karyabinayak Municipality
 Sankhu
 Siddhipur, now Mahalakshmi Municipality
 Sunakothi, now Lalitpur Municipality
 Thaiba, now Godawari Municipality
 Thecho, now Godawari Municipality
 Thuladurlung
 Tikathali, now Mahalakshmi Municipality

Other places
 Jharuwarasi
 Chyasal
 Jawalakhel
 Pyan Gaun
 Lagankhel
 Jhamsikhel
 Kumaripati
 Kupondole
 Kusunti
 माल्टा

Education

Lalitpur District has adequate education facilities in comparison to other districts, including:
 Adarsha Vidya Mandir (AVM)
 Adarsha Saula Yubak Higher Secondary School
 AIMS Academy
 Graded English Medium School (GEMS)
 Annal Jyoti Boarding School (AJS)
 United Universal School
 Ideal Model School
 Institute of Engineering (Pulchok)
 I.J. Pioneer High School
 Little Angels' School
 Little Learners Fun School (Saibu Bhaisepati)
 Rato Bangala school
 United school (Imadol) 
 St. Mary's School 
 St. Xavier's School
 Nepal Don Bosco School, Siddhipur
 Shuvatara School
 Vajra Academy (Jharuwarashi)
 Milestone School
 Anant English School, Siddhipur
 The Sudesha School (Nakhkhu)
 Pawan Prakriti English Secondary school (Tikathali)
 Pathshala Nepal Foundation (Bagdol)
Prasadi Academy, Manbhawan
 Nalanda Secondary Boarding School (Satdobato)
 Kshitiz Secondary Boarding School (Harisiddhi)
 Nawa Bihani School, Imadole
 Oracle English Medium School
 Royal Yala World School
 Unique Academy/College, Kumaripati
 United Academy (Kumaripati) 
Kitini secondary higher school (thaukhel)

Sports 

Lalitpur is also home to several notable sporting organisations and grounds such as:

ANFA Complex, Satdobato
Tennis Complex, Satdobato
Army Physical Training Centre, Lagankhel
Chyasal Technical Centre, Chyasal
 Thecho Badminton Club
 Pragaypokhari Badminton Circle,Prayagpokhari

References

External links

Lamatar / Lalitpur Photos, October 2007

 
Newar
Districts of Nepal established in 1962
Districts of Bagmati Province